Where in the World? is the third album by Bill Frisell to be released on the Elektra Nonesuch label. It was released in 1991 and features performances by Frisell, cellist  Hank Roberts, bassist Kermit Driscoll and drummer Joey Baron.

Reception
The Allmusic review by Daniel Gioffre awarded the album 4½ stars, writing, "One of the high points of '90s jazz guitar, Where in the World? is essential for fans of modern jazz".

Track listing
All compositions by Bill Frisell.
 "Unsung Heroes" – 5:08  
 "Rob Roy" – 6:56  
 "Spell" – 6:59  
 "Child at Heart" – 5:57  
 "Beautiful E." – 3:22  
 "Again" – 6:38  
 "Smilin' Jones" – 2:34  
 "Where in the World?" – 5:30  
 "Worry Doll" – 4:58  
 "Let Me In" – 6:02

Personnel
Bill Frisell: guitars, ukulele
Hank Roberts: cello, jazz-a-phone, fiddle
Kermit Driscoll: bass
Joey Baron: drums

References 

1991 albums
Bill Frisell albums
Nonesuch Records albums